Chrysomyxa himalensis, (also called spruce needle rust) is a species of rust fungi in the Coleosporiaceae family that can be found on Rhododendron and Picea species in the Himalayan region of southern Asia and was introduced in the United States.

References

Fungal plant pathogens and diseases
himalensis
Fungi of Asia